Sardinero is a popular beach located in the Spanish city of Santander, Cantabria. The beach is divided in two by the gardens of Piquio about one-quarter the way along its length, stretching from the Magdalena Peninsula to Mataleñas; two further adjacent beaches are also sometimes included.

Sardinero is lined with hotels, restaurants, and a casino, and is regarded as one of the most elegant beach resorts in Spain.

References

Beaches of Cantabria
Tourist attractions in Cantabria